Antonio Cosentino (10 March 1919 – 1993) was an Italian sailor. Cosentino was born in Naples. He won the bronze medal in dragon class at the 1960 Summer Olympics.

References

External links
 
 
 

1919 births
1993 deaths
Italian male sailors (sport)
Olympic sailors of Italy
Olympic bronze medalists for Italy
Olympic medalists in sailing
Sailors at the 1952 Summer Olympics – 6 Metre
Sailors at the 1956 Summer Olympics – 5.5 Metre
Sailors at the 1960 Summer Olympics – Dragon
Medalists at the 1960 Summer Olympics